Ilse Grubrich-Simitis is a German psychoanalyst.   She works in private practice and as a training analyst at the Frankfurt Psychoanalytical Institute.

Freud 
Grubrich-Simitis has worked for several decades as an academic researcher.   The focus of her work is Sigmund Freud, on whom she has published several substantial volumes, contributing to a sharpened appreciation of Freud's written work.   Since the 1960s she has worked for S. Fischer Verlag on the publisher's ten volume compilation of Freud's works and letters, initially as a publishing-editor and more recently with overall responsibility for the project.   Currently she is also a co-editor of the publisher's Yearbook of Psychoanalysis.

Awards and honours 
 1998 Sigmund Freud Prize for Academic prose 
 1998 Mary S. Sigourney Award

Personal 
Ilse Grubrich-Simitis married the lawyer and data-protection expert Spiros Simitis on 3 August 1963.

Output (selection) 
 Sigmund Freud: Werkausgabe in zwei Bänden. Band 1: Elemente der Psychoanalyse. Band 2: Anwendungen der Psychoanalyse. Hrsg. und komm. von Anna Freud und Ilse Grubrich-Simitis. Fischer Verlag, Frankfurt am Main 2006, .
 Michelangelos Moses und Freuds „Wagstück“. Eine Collage. Fischer Verlag, Frankfurt am Main 2004, .
 Hundert Jahre „Traumdeutung“ von Sigmund Freud. Gemeinsam mit Mark Solms und Jean Starobinski. Fischer-Taschenbuch, Frankfurt am Main 2000.
 Urbuch der Psychoanalyse : hundert Jahre Studien über Hysterie von Josef Breuer und Sigmund Freud. Fischer Verlag, Frankfurt am Main 1995, .

References 

German psychoanalysts
German editors
German women editors
People from Frankfurt